Brummer was a training ship of Nazi Germany's Kriegsmarine during World War II designed in the mid 1930s primarily for anti-aircraft gunnery training, she was also fitted for mine laying, her intended duty in wartime. Brummer was also used to test high pressure steam turbine systems designed for the German destroyers.

She took part in the invasion of Poland, laying mines off the Polish coast. In January 1940 she was used as a commerce raider in the Baltic Sea and later took part in the invasion of Norway; as a command ship of a transport squadron.

Design
In the mid-1930s two artillery training ships were built to drill the gunnery personal of the Kriegsmarine. Although Brummer was primarily designed for anti-aircraft gunnery training, she was also fitted for mine laying, her intended primary duty during wartime.

Brummer was also used as an experimental ship for the high pressure steam turbine systems designed for the German destroyers. The propulsion system of Brummer showed no major design flaws, and the destroyers were fitted with an almost identical system. This design later proved to be unreliable when used in the destroyers.

Early history
After being commissioned in 1936 Brummer worked up in the Baltic Sea, and was then attached to the Naval Air Defense and Artillery School (German: Marineflugabwehr- und Küstenartillerieschule) in Swinemünde in the spring of 1937. Between 1937 and 1938 Brummer made two visits to Odde, Göteborg, and Helsingborg.

Wartime career

In September 1939, Brummer took part in the invasion of Poland, laying mines off the Polish coast. In January 1940 she was used as a commerce raider in the Baltic Sea.

In April 1940, Brummer took part in Operation Weserübung, the invasion of Norway; as a command ship of a transport squadron. The ship was held afloat for nine hours, finally capsizing in the early morning of the next day.

References
Brummer at german-navy.de

Minelayers of the Reichsmarine
Ships built in Bremen (state)
1935 ships
Training ships of the Kriegsmarine
Minelayers of the Kriegsmarine
Ships sunk by British submarines
World War II shipwrecks in the North Sea
Maritime incidents in April 1940